Mangú is the Dominican Republic's national breakfast. This traditional Dominican dish can also be served for lunch or dinner.

Method 
Mangú is made up of boiled green plantains with or without peel on. When cooked through and soft the peel is removed. Plantains are then mashed with a fork and some water in which they were boiled. The goal is to mash plantains until smooth with some to no lumps. The dish is topped with sautéed red onions that have been cooked with vinegar and oil.

Variations 
Los tres golpes (the three hits) is the slang name given by Dominicans consisting of fried Dominican-style salami, fried cheese, and fried eggs served alongside mangú. The salami and cheese can be coated in flour before frying for a more crispy texture.

Green plantains can be replaced with ripe-plantains, green bananas, or squash. The squash version is known as mazamorra.

Etymology 
Boiled mashed plantains can be traced back to Africans in the Congo region who were brought to the island during the slave trade. The original word was something akin to "mangusi" and referred to almost any root vegetable that was boiled and mashed.

Origin 

Fufu is a dish brought over by African slaves into the Caribbean and parts of Latin America. Before cassava was introduced plantains, green bananas, and yams where boiled and mashed with milk, butter and the water it was boiled in.

Today this dish and its variations go by mangú in the Dominican Republic, fufu de plátano in Cuba and Panama, angú in Costa Rica, hudut in Belize, bolón in Ecuador, tacacho in Peru, mofongo in Puerto Rico, and cayeye or cabeza de gato in Colombia.

Folklore and apocryphal 
A popular folk tale exists, in which this dish was served to American soldiers during the American occupation of the country in the early 20th century, and that one of the dining soldiers exclaimed, “Man, good!” But there is no contemporary evidence of an American origin for the word.

See also 

Cayeye
Fufu
Mofongo
Tacacho

References

Further reading
 

Latin American cuisine
Dominican Republic cuisine
Staple foods
Plantain dishes